Najafabad (also Romanized as Najafābād and Nejafābād) is a village in Garmkhan Rural District, Garmkhan District, Bojnord County, North Khorasan Province, Iran. At the 2006 census, its population was 481, in 123 families.

References 

Populated places in Bojnord County